Cammell may refer to:

British Rail Metro-Cammell Lightweight, lightweight Diesel multiple units introduced in 1955
Cammell Laird, British shipbuilders during the nineteenth and twentieth centuries
Cammell Laird 1907 F.C., football club based at Kirklands Stadium in Rock Ferry, Birkenhead, Merseyside, England
Cammell Laird Gibraltar, ship repair facility at Gibraltar
Cammell Laird Social Club, the ninth album released by UK rock band Half Man Half Biscuit in 2002
MTR Metro Cammell EMU (AC), electric multiple unit owned and operated by the Kowloon-Canton Railway Corporation
Metro-Cammell, Birmingham, England based manufacturer of railway carriages and wagons
Metro Cammell Weymann, formed in 1932 to produce bus bodies
NZR RM class (Sentinel-Cammell), steam-powered railcar operated by the New Zealand Railways Department

People with the surname
Donald Cammell (1934–1996), Scottish film director
Reginald Archibald Cammell (1886–1911), first British military aviator to die on active service
Thomas Cammell